The International Bank of Qatar, often branded ibq, was a private sector bank operating in Qatar founded in 1956. The bank offered a range of products and services across retail, private and corporate banking divisions.

ibq had a growing network of branches and ATMs covering most major locations across the country. It merged with Barwa Bank in 2019.

History
Starting as the Ottoman Bank on 1 November 1956, ibq underwent several ownerships in its history.

In 1969 the Ottoman Bank sold its branches to the National and Grindlays Bank which later became known as Grindlays. In 1989, the bank changed names again to ANZ Grindlays when it was acquired by the Australia & New Zealand Banking Group. In 2000, Standard Chartered acquired ANZ Grindlays.

In August 2004, the bank was renamed International Bank of Qatar (ibq), when National Bank of Kuwait (NBK) acquired a 20% stake in the bank and assumed management responsibilities. In July 2007, NBK increased its share of the bank to 30% and sold them back to Qatari investors in 2014.

In July 2015, ibq has received investment grade credit ratings of “A2” and “A+” assigned by Moody’s and Fitch Ratings, respectively.

References

External links
 Official Website (English)
Official Website (Arabic)

Banks established in 1956
Banks of Qatar
Companies based in Doha
Standard Chartered
1956 establishments in Qatar
Banks disestablished in 2019